The geography of Bolivia includes the Eastern Andes Mountain Range (also called the Cordillera Oriental) which bisects Bolivia roughly from north to south.  To the east of that mountain chain are lowland plains of the Amazon Basin, and to the west is the Altiplano which is a highland plateau where Lake Titicaca is located.  Bolivia's geography has features similar to those of Peru which abuts Bolivia's northwest border; like Bolivia, Peru is bisected from north to south by the Eastern Andes Mountains, and these two countries share Lake Titicaca which is the highest navigable lake on Earth.  Unlike Peru, however, Bolivia is one of the two landlocked countries in South America, the other being Paraguay which is located along Bolivia's southeast border.

Overview
The most prominent feature of the Altiplano is the large lake at its northern end, Lake Titicaca. The lake actually moderates the climate for a considerable distance around it, making crops of maize and wheat possible in sheltered areas. 

Lake Titicaca drains southward through the slow-moving, reed-filled Desaguadero River to Lake Poopó.

In western Bolivia, the Cordillera Occidental is a chain of dormant volcanoes and solfataras, volcanic vents emitting sulfurous gases. Bolivia's highest peak, the snowcapped Nevado Sajama , is located here. The entire cordillera is of volcanic origin and an extension of the volcanic region found in southern Peru. Rainfall, although scanty everywhere, is greater in the northern half, where the land is covered with scrub vegetation. The southern area receives almost no precipitation, and the landscape consists mostly of barren rocks. All of the Cordillera Occidental regions are sparsely populated, and the south is virtually uninhabited. 

The Altiplano, the high plateau between the previous range, and the Cordillera Oriental, comprises four major basins formed by mountainous spurs that jut eastward from the Cordillera Occidental about halfway to the Cordillera Oriental. Along the Altiplano's eastern side is a continuous flat area, which has served as Bolivia's principal north–south transport corridor since colonial times. The entire Altiplano was originally a deep rift between the cordilleras that gradually filled with highly porous sedimentary debris washed down from the peaks. This sedimentary origin explains its gradual slope from north to south; greater rainfall in the north has washed a larger quantity of debris onto the platform floor. 

Rainfall in the Altiplano decreases toward the south, and the scrub vegetation grows more sparse, eventually giving way to barren rocks and dry red clay. The land contains several salt flats, the dried remnants of ancient lakes. The largest of these - and the world's largest salt concentration - is the Uyuni Saltpan, which covers over 9,000 square kilometers. The salt is more than five meters deep in the center of this flat. In the dry season, the lake bed can be traversed by heavy trucks. Near the Argentine border, the floor of the Altiplano rises again, creating hills and volcanoes that span the gap between the eastern and western cordilleras of the Andes. 

The much older Cordillera Oriental enters Bolivia on the north side of Lake Titicaca, extends southeastward to approximately 17 south latitude, then broadens and stretches south to the Argentine border. The northernmost part of the Cordillera Oriental, the Cordillera Real, is an impressive snow-capped series of granite mountains. Some of these peaks exceed   and two - Illimani  , which overlooks the city of La Paz, and Illampu   - have large glaciers on their upper slopes. South of 17 south latitude, the range changes character. Called the Cordillera Central here, the land is a large block of the Earth's crust that has been lifted and tilted eastward. The western edge of this block rises in a series of cliffs from the Altiplano. Too high to be exploited for large-scale commercial grazing, this area takes its name from the predominant vegetation type, the puna.

Valleys
The northeastern flank of the Cordillera Real is known as the Yungas, from the Aymara and Quechua word yunka meaning "warm valley." The steep, almost inaccessible slopes and peaks of this mainly semitropical valley area northeast of La Paz offer some of the most spectacular scenery in Bolivia. Rainfall is heavy, and lush vegetation clings to the sides of narrow river valleys. The land is among the most fertile in Bolivia, but poor transport has hindered its agricultural development. The government attempted to build a railway through the Yungas in 1917 to connect La Paz with the eastern lowlands. The railway was abandoned, however, after completion of only 150 kilometres. 

The eastern slopes of the Cordillera Central descend gradually in a series of complex north–south ranges and hills. Rivers, draining to the east, have cut long narrow valleys; these valleys and the basins between the ranges are favorable areas for crops and settlement. Rich alluvial soils fill the low areas, but erosion has followed the removal of vegetation in some places. The valley floors range from 2,000 to 3,000 metres above sea level, and this lower elevation means milder temperatures than those of the Altiplano. The cities of Sucre, Cochabamba and the upper area of Tarija department, are located in basins of this vast region.

Lowlands
The eastern lowlands include all of Bolivia north and east of the Andes. Although comprising over two-thirds of the national territory, the region is sparsely populated and, until recently, has played a minor role in the economy. 

Differences in topography and climate separate the lowlands into three areas. The flat northern area, made up of Beni and Pando Departments and the northern part of Cochabamba Department, consists of rainforest. Because much of the topsoil is underlain by claypan, drainage is poor, and heavy rainfall periodically converts vast parts of the region to swamp. The central area, comprising the northern half of Santa Cruz Department, has gently rolling hills and a drier climate than the north. Forests alternate with savanna, and much of the land has been cleared for cultivation. Santa Cruz, the largest city in the lowlands, is located here, as are most of Bolivia's petroleum and natural gas reserves. The southeastern part of the lowlands is part of the Gran Chaco. Virtually rainless for nine months of the year, this area becomes flooded for the three months of heavy rains. The extreme variation in rainfall supports only thorny scrub vegetation and cattle grazing, although recent discoveries of natural gas and petroleum near the foothills of the Andes have attracted some settlers to the region. 

Most of Bolivia's important rivers are found in the water-rich northern parts of the lowlands, particularly in the Alto Beni (Upper Beni), where the land is suitable for crops such as coffee and cacao. The northern lowlands are drained by wide, slow-moving rivers, the three largest of which—the Mamoré, Beni, and Madre de Dios—all flow northward into the Madeira River in Brazil and eventually into the River Amazon. Riverboats along the Beni and the Mamoré carry both passenger and freight traffic; rapids on the Madeira prevent river traffic farther into Brazil. Near the Paraguayan border, shallow sandy streams carry the seasonal runoff into the Pilcomayo or Paraguay rivers. Also, the Pantanal, the world's largest wetland of any kind, has some of its area in Bolivia.

Despite the fact that eastern Bolivia is described a lowland in when seeing the general topography of the country there are mountains and mountain ranges well beyond the Andes. The most notable of these mountains are the forested Serranías Chiquitanas in eastern Santa Cruz Department.

Climate 

Bolivia has several geographical areas and climates, and the three predominant ones are Andean (28% of the territory), sub-Andean (13%), and plains (59%).  The climate of Bolivia, especially temperature, is strongly influenced by surface elevation.  The climate of Bolivia varies drastically from one ecoregion to the other, from the tropics in the eastern llanos to polar climates in the western Andes. The summers are warm, humid in the east and dry in the west, with rains that often modify temperatures, humidity, winds, atmospheric pressure and evaporation, giving place to very different climates. When the climatological phenomenon known as El Niño takes place, it provokes great alterations in the weather. Winters are very cold in the west, and it snows around the mountain ranges, while in the western regions, windy days are more usual. The autumn is dry in the non-tropical regions.

 Llanos. A humid tropical climate with an average temperature of 30° C (86° F). The wind coming from the Amazon rainforest causes significant rainfall. Starting in May, there is low precipitation because of dry winds, and most days have clear skies. Even so, winds from the south, called surazos, can bring cooler temperatures lasting several days. Precipitation in these areas ranges from 1,100mm to 2,000mm per year, with some areas bordering the Southwestern Amazonian moist forests receiving up to 3,000mm per year.

 Chiquitanía. A humid tropical climate with an average temperature of 30° C (86° F). The wind coming from the Amazon rainforest causes considerable rainfall, with a short but noticeable dry season typically starting in May. "Surazos" can bring cooler temperatures lasting several days. Precipitation in these areas ranges from 750mm to 1,500mm per year, with remote areas in central eastern Santa Cruz receiving up to 2,000mm per year.

 Selva. A humid tropical climate with an average temperature of 30° C (86° F). The Southwestern Bands of the Amazon rainforest for the central and northwestern areas of Bolivia, where temperatures are hot for a majority of the year, with slightly milder winters. Precipitation in these areas ranges from 2,000mm to 4,000mm per year, with some areas around Tunari receiving up to 7,000mm per year.

 Humid Altiplano. Subtropical highland climate-Polar climates, with strong and cold winds. The average temperature ranges from 15 to 20° C (59-68° F). At night, temperatures descend drastically to slightly above 0° C (32° F), while during the day, the weather is dry and solar radiation is high. Ground frosts occur every month, and snow is frequent. Precipitation in these areas ranges between 450mm to 1,300mm per year, with local areas in Lake Titicaca receiving up to 2,000mm per year.

 Dry Altiplano. Desert-Polar climates, with strong and cold winds. The average temperature ranges from 15 to 20° C (59-68° F). At night, temperatures descend drastically to slightly above 0° C (32° F), while during the day, the weather is dry and solar radiation is high. Ground frosts occur every month, and snow is frequent. Precipitation in these areas ranges from 50mm to 400mm per year.

 Temperate Valleys and Yungas. Temperate climate. The humid northeastern winds are pushed to the mountains, making this region very humid and rainy. Temperatures are cooler at higher elevations. Snow occurs at altitudes of 2,000 meters. Precipitation in these areas ranges from 600mm to 2,000mm per year.

 Xeric Valleys. Semiarid climate. The wind shadows created by the steep Bolivian central highlands make these regions dry for much of the year, with bursts of precipitation in summer thunderstorms. Temperatures are cooler at higher elevations. Precipitation in these areas ranges from 350mm to 600mm per year.

 Chaco. Subtropical Semi-arid climate. Rain and humidity in January and the rest of the year, with warm days and cool nights. Precipitation in these areas ranges from 450mm to 1,500mm per year.

Examples

Statistics
Terrain:
rugged Andes Mountains with a highland plateau (Altiplano), hills, lowland plains of the Amazon Basin

Natural resources:
tin, natural gas, petroleum, zinc, tungsten, antimony, silver, iron, lead, gold, timber, hydro-power

Land borders: Argentina (942 km), Brazil (3,403 km), Chile (942 km), Paraguay (753 km), Peru (1,212 km)

Land use:
As of 2016, the population of Bolivia was more urban (66%) than rural (34%).
arable land:
3.97%
permanent crops:
0.20%
other:
95.83% (2012)

Irrigated land:
1,282 km2 (2003)

Total renewable water resources:
622.5 cu km (2011)

Freshwater withdrawal (domestic/industrial/agricultural:
total: 2.64 km³/yr (25%/14%/61%)
per capita: 305.8 m³/yr (2005)

Natural hazards:
flooding in the northeast (March–April)

Environment - current issues:
the clearing of land for agricultural purposes and the international demand for tropical timber are contributing to deforestation; soil erosion from overgrazing and poor cultivation methods (including slash-and-burn agriculture); desertification; loss of biodiversity; industrial pollution of water supplies used for drinking and irrigation

Environment - international agreements:
party to:
Biodiversity, Climate Change, Climate Change-Kyoto Protocol, Desertification, Endangered Species, Hazardous Wastes, Law of the Sea, Marine Dumping, Nuclear Test Ban, Ozone Layer Protection, Ship Pollution, Tropical Timber 83, Tropical Timber 94, Wetlands
signed, but not ratified:
Environmental Modification, Marine Life Conservation

Geography - note:
landlocked; separated from the Pacific Ocean via Chile. Bolivia shares control of Lago Titicaca, world's highest navigable lake (elevation 3,805 m), with Peru

Location and extreme points 
Bolivia is bordered in the northwest by Peru, and in the southwest by Chile; both Peru and Bolivia are split by the Andes Mountains roughly from north to south, and those two countries therefore have very similar geographic regions, except that Bolivia's Pacific coast was lost to Chile during the War of the Pacific in 1880.  Bolivia is also bordered by Brazil in the north and east, by Paraguay in the southeast, and by Argentina in the south.

 Northernmost point – the Madeira River on the border with Brazil, near Ponte sobre o Rio Abunã, Federico Román Province, Pando Department
 Southernmost point – southern tip of the Eduardo Avaroa Andean Fauna National Reserve, Sur Lípez Province, Potosí Department
 Westernmost point – on the border with Peru, José Manuel Pando Province, La Paz Department
Easternmost point – on the border with Brazil, Germán Busch Province, Santa Cruz Department
 Highest point – Nevado Sajama: 6,542 m
 Lowest point – Rio Paraguay: 90 m

See also
Geology of Bolivia

References

 
 
 Hudson, Rex A. and Hanratty, Dennis M., ed. Bolivia: A Country Study. Washington: GPO for the Library of Congress, 1989.

External links

Map of Bolivia from 1894